The oldest football clubs trace their origins to the mid-19th century, a period when football evolved from being a casual pastime to an organised mainstream sport.

The identity of the oldest football clubs in the world, or even in a particular country, is often disputed or claimed by several clubs, across several codes of football. The Foot-Ball Club of Edinburgh is thought to be the earliest recorded football club in the world, with records going back to 1824. Rugby clubs also referred to themselves, or continue to refer to themselves, as simply a "football club", or as a "rugby football club". "Club" has always meant an independent entity and, during the historical period in question, very few high school or university teams were independent of the educational institutions concerned. Consequently, school and university football teams were seldom referred to as "clubs". That has always been the case, for example, in American football, which has always had ties to college sport in general. Conversely, however, the oldest still-existing "football club" with a well-documented, continuous history is Dublin University Football Club, a rugby union club founded in 1854 at Trinity College, Dublin, Ireland. There exists some record of Guy's Hospital Football Club being founded in London in 1843, through an 1883 fixture card referring to Guy's 40th season.

Britain & Ireland

Defunct clubs

While the first clubs emerged in Britain, possibly as early as the fifteenth century, these are poorly-documented and defunct. For example, the records of the Brewers' Company of London between 1421 and 1423 mention the hiring out of their hall "by the "football players" for "20 pence", under the heading "Trades and Fraternities". The listing of football players as a "fraternity" or a group of players meeting socially under this identity is the earliest allusion to what might be considered a football club. Other early sporting bodies dedicated to playing football include "The Gymnastic Society" of London which met regularly during the second half of the eighteenth century to pursue two sports: football and wrestling. The club played its matches – for example between London-based natives of Cumberland and Westmorland – at the Kennington Common from well before 1789 until about 1800.

The Foot-Ball Club (active 1824–41) of Edinburgh, Scotland, is the first documented club dedicated to football, and the first to describe itself as a football club. The only surviving club rules forbade tripping, but allowed pushing and holding and the picking up of the ball. Other documents describe a game involving 39 players and "such kicking of shins and such tumbling".

Other early clubs include the Great Leicestershire Cricket and Football Club present in 1840.

On Christmas Day 1841, an early documented match between two self-described "football clubs" took place. The Body-guard Club (of Rochdale) lost to the Fear-nought Club after using an ineligible player as a substitute. The complete rules used in this game are unknown, but they specified twelve players on each side, with each team providing its own umpire, and the game being started by the firing of a pistol.

A club for playing "cricket, quoits and football" was established in Newcastle on Tyne in or before 1848. The Surrey Football Club was established in 1849 and published the first non-school football list of rules (which were probably based upon the eighteenth century Gymnastic Society cited above). Windsor Home Park F.C. was in existence as early as 1854, and would go on to compete in early editions of the FA Cup.

Continuous clubs
Supported by the Guinness Book of Records, and founded by staff at Guy's Hospital in London in 1843, the Guy's, Kings and St Thomas' RFC would be the oldest "football" club of any code. Nevertheless, the connection between the present club and the original "Guy's Hospital" formed in 1843 is still disputed, alleging that the present club is a modern amalgam of three formerly distinct hospital rugby clubs, starting with the Guy's Hospital and St Thomas' Hospital teams which were the first to merge following the union of their respective Medical Departments. The last department to merge was the King's College Hospital in 1999, although its club (founded in 1869) remained as a separate institution.

As the Guy's, Kings and St Thomas' RFC status is still disputed, other sources state that the Dublin University Football Club (DUFC), founded in 1854, at Trinity College, Dublin, Ireland, would be the oldest "football" club. DUFC plays to the rugby union rules.

In Northern Ireland, the oldest football club is North of Ireland F.C., formed in 1868. It was the first rugby club formed in what is now Northern Ireland and only two other clubs - Dublin University and Wanderers - were formed earlier anywhere else in all Ireland.

It has been claimed that the present-day Barnes Rugby Football Club, from Barnes in London, is a continuation of the nineteenth-century Barnes Football Club, and moreover that the latter club was formed in 1839 and is thus the oldest club to have played football for its entire history. However, as of 2018, Barnes RFC's website claims only that the club was established in the 1920s, while alluding to "possibilities" that its history stretches back to 1862. In 2021, people with heritage and local enthusiasts revived the old Barnes Football Club, established in 1862.

Sheffield F.C. in England, is the world's oldest surviving independent open football club: that is, the oldest club not associated with an institution such as a school, hospital or university; and which was open to all to play. It was founded in 1857. Sheffield F.C. initially played Sheffield rules, a code of its own devising, although the club's rules influenced those of the England Football Association (FA (1863) including handball, free kicks, corners and throw ins. While the international governing body of association football, FIFA and the FA recognise Sheffield F.C. as the "world's oldest football club", and the club joined the FA in 1863, it continued to use the Sheffield rules. Sheffield F.C. did not officially adopt association football until 1877.

Setting its birth date in 1856, Cambridge University A.F.C. has been described by the university as the oldest club now playing association football, being recognised by The FA. For example, : "Salopians formed a club of their own in the late 1830s/early 1840s but that was presumably absorbed by the Cambridge University Football Club that they were so influential in creating in 1846". According to Charles Astor Bristed, in the early 1840s at Cambridge, there were games played between clubs from colleges and houses. Football is documented as being played on the original club ground, Parkers Piece, as early as 1838. The earliest existing evidence of the Cambridge University Football Club comes from "The Laws of the University Football Club" dated 1856, and held at Shrewsbury School. The Cambridge rules of 1863 would provide the basis for the FA's original rules.

The only survivor among the FA's founding clubs still playing association football is Civil Service F.C. Six of the 18 founding members later adopted rugby exclusively. Cray Wanderers F.C., originally of St Mary Cray and currently playing in Bromley, founded in 1860, is the oldest club now playing association football in Greater London. The code played by Cray Wanderers in its earliest years is unknown.

Liverpool Football Club (not to be confused with Liverpool F.C. of the Premier League), later known as Liverpool St Helens F.C., were formed in 1857, which claims to be the oldest open rugby club in the world. The club adopted the Rugby Union rules in 1872, never playing association rules.

Rest of the world

Africa 
South Africa

Hamilton Rugby Football Club was founded in March 1875 in Cape Town, and states that it is the oldest Rugby union club in South Africa.

Egypt

Gezira SC was the oldest club in Egypt founded in 1882.

Algeria

CDJ Oran was founded in 1894. It is the oldest club in Algeria and Maghreb.

Tanzania

Young Africans was founded in 1935. It is the oldest club in Tanzania.

Tunisia

ES Tunis was founded in 1919. It is the oldest club in Tunisia.

Ghana

Accra Hearts Of Oaks was founded in 1911. It is the oldest club in Ghana.

Morocco

Moghreb Tétouan was founded in 1922. It is the oldest club in Morocco. Moghreb Tétouan took part in Spanish Liga for 33 years until Morocco's independence was achieved in 1956.

Asia

Hong Kong
Some of the oldest clubs in Hong Kong include St Joseph's (1880), Hong Kong Football Club (1886), Buffs (1886), all formed by Britons. The first club formed by locals was South China AA (1904).

India
In India, some of the oldest clubs are Calcutta Football Club (founded in 1872, later merged with Calcutta Cricket Club founded in 1792 to form Calcutta Cricket and Football Club), Sarada FC, Aryan FC (1884), Sovabazar FC (1886), Mohun Bagan AC (1889), Mohammedan SC (1891), and East Bengal Club (1920). All of these clubs are from Kolkata.

Indonesia
The oldest football club in Indonesia is Gymnastiek Vereeniging, founded in the town of Medan in 1887.

The oldest still active football club in Indonesia is UMS 1905, founded in 1905, currently competing in Liga 3 Jakarta. Several local clubs in the 1900s during the Dutch East Indies era that entered into internal teams such as Hercules, Vios Batavia (Persija internal); Sidolig, UNI Bandung (Persib internal) and others.

Iraq
Al-Quwa Al-Jawiya is a Baghdad-based men's club founded in 1931 in Kingdom of Iraq under British Administration. It plays within the Iraqi Premier League.

Japan
In Japan, the oldest rugby (1866) and association football club (1886) is Yokohama Country & Athletic Club.

The oldest continuing association football club is Tokyo Shukyu-Dan, founded in 1917.

Pakistan
The oldest continuing association football club for men of nowadays Pakistan is Karachi Port Trust Football Club, founded in 1887, at the time of the British Raj, when Karachi was part of the Bombay Presidency.

For women, the oldest club is Diya W.F.C., established in Karachi in 2002.

Continental Europe

Albania 
The first football club to be founded in Albania was the Vllaznia Sport Club on the 16 February 1919.

Austria 
The oldest still active football club is the First Vienna Football Club founded on the 22nd of August 1894. Their early rivals, the Vienna Cricket and Football-Club, was founded only one day later.

Belgium 
Football Club Spa was founded by the Hunter-Blair family of Blairquhan, Ayrshire, Scotland, and was in operation in 1863. The fourth Baronet took his family there in order to economise. The oldest club still in existence today in Belgium is Royal Antwerp FC, founded in 1880.

Bosnia and Herzegovina 
The oldest football club in Bosnia and Herzegovina is FK Sloboda founded in Novi Grad in 1910. The first club to be ever founded was Zrinjski Mostar in 1903, but it was inactive between 1945 and 1996.

Czech Republic 
The oldest football club still in existence today is Slavia Prague, founded in 1892. The first football club to be founded in the country was the football section of the sport club Regatta Prague, founded in May 1891, but discontinued in 1896, when all its footballers left to found the club DFC Prague.

Croatia 
The oldest still active football club in Croatia is NK Rijeka, formed in 1904 and playing association football at the latest in 1906, currently competing in the first Croatian league. HNK Segesta, that plays in the third division, was possibly founded in 1906, but its first recorded match was held in 1909.

Denmark 
Kjøbenhavns Boldklub is the oldest football club in Denmark and the oldest active club in continental Europe. The sports club was formed in 1876 and association football was first played two years later.

Estonia
In nowadays Estonian state was the oldest formed club Tallinna JS(Jalgpalliselts) Meteor in 1909. It's defunct since 1911, but restored after First World War and Estonian War of Independence in 1926 under the name Tallinna SK Meteor which took action until 1937.

France
The first football club in France was established in Paris in 1863 by English expatriates, as the following excerpt from a contemporary newspaper shows: "A number of English gentlemen living in Paris have lately organised a football club.... The football contests take place in the Bois de Boulogne, by permission of the authorities and surprise the French amazingly".

Le Havre AC was founded as an athletics and rugby club in 1872, making it the oldest surviving football club registered in France and continental Europe. They began playing association football on a regular basis in 1894. Technically AS Strasbourg could be considered the first French association football team, being established in 1890; they were however a German team at the time.

Germany
The oldest surviving rugby football club is Heidelberger RK, which was founded on 9 May 1872 as a rowing and rugby club. The HRK has won 14 national titles 1927, 1928, 1971, 1973, 1976, 1986, 2010–2015, 2017 and 2018. The biggest success of the club was the qualification for the Rugby European Challenge Cup 2018/19 - only to be denied participation, because their main sponsor owns Stade Français. The second oldest still surviving rugby club is Hannover 1878 founded 1878 and winning 9 German championships. Both clubs still play in the 1. Bundesliga.

The first association football in Germany (and likely the first outside Great Britain) was Dresden English, founded on 18 March 1874. The club had over 70 members by then, primarily Englishmen working in Dresden, with its matches being attended by hundreds of spectators. Nevertheless, Dresden English was dissolved in 1898.

The oldest still active association football club is BFC Germania 1888 founded on 15 April 1888. They play in the 10th division as of season 2020/21 and never managed to win any national titles.

Greece
The oldest still active football club is Panionios F.C. founded on 14 September 1890. This club was founded in the city of Smyrna, on the Aegean coast of the Ottoman Empire in present-day Izmir (Turkey). The club was relocated to Greece in 1922.

Hungary 
The oldest still active football clubs in Hungary are Műegyetemi AFC founded in autumn 1897 as a proper football club and III. Kerületi TVE, which whose football section was founded officially in 1899 but stemmed from the 1897-founded Budai Football Csapat. The first ever football club to be founded in Hungary was Budapesti Torna Club having founded its football section in February 1897, dissolved in 1945–46.

Serbia 
The oldest club in Serbia is FK BASK, founded in 1903.

Italy
In Italy, Genoa C.F.C. is the oldest active football club: it was founded by Charles De Grave Sells, S. Green, George Blake, W. Rilley, George Dormer Fawcus, H.M. Sandys, E. De Thierry, Johnathan Summerhill Sr., Johnathan Summerhill Jr. and Sir Charles Alfred Payton in Genoa on 7 September 1893. However, Genoa C.F.C. was not the first Italian football club, being Torino Football & Cricket Club (1887) but its history lasted only for 4 years. Founded by Edoardo Bosio (owner of Bosio & Caratsch, the earliest brewery in Italy), the team broke up in 1891. Older than Genoa and Torino is Associazione Sportiva Dilettantistica Fanfulla, a sports club founded in Lodi in 1873, but its football section was established thirty-five years later in 1908.

Latvia
Salamandra metal factory(owned by British) workers in Riga founded the first football team in 1907- British Fooball Club (BFC), later - Britannia.

Montenegro 
The oldest football club in Montenegro is FK Lovčen founded in the town of Cetinje in 1913.

Netherlands
The oldest football (and also the oldest cricket) club in The Netherlands is Koninklijke UD (Royal UD) from Deventer, founded in 1875.

North Macedonia
The oldest football club in North Macedonia is founded in 1919 FK Ljuboten.

Norway
The first football team in Norway was probably started by a buekorps in Bergen, Nygaards Bataljon, in 1883.[4] In 1885 the first Norwegian club however, Idrætsforeningen Odd, was founded in Skien. The footballing interest was very low, and was put on ice after a few months. However, the club Odd Grenland started up with football again in 1894, and are now Norway's oldest football club.

Poland
The oldest football club in Poland was Lechia Lwów, established in 1903. As Lviv became a part of the USSR (and nowadays Ukraine), the club ceased to exist. Seniority of the football club in current borders of Poland and still active in the Polish league system is subject to a dispute between two Kraków based clubs Wisła Kraków and Cracovia. Both clubs have been founded in 1906.

Portugal 
In Portugal, Académica de Coimbra is the oldest active football club, founded on 3 November 1887.

Romania 
The oldest football club in romania is FK Csíkszereda, founded in 1904.

Slovakia 
The oldest football club in Slovakia is 1. FC Tatran Prešov, founded in 1898, that after many name changes plays in the Slovak second league.

Slovenia 
The first football club was founded in 1900 by the German minority in Ljubljana, the Laibacher Sportverein and got discontinued in 1909, followed by the Hungarian minority Lendevai FE in 1903, and the German minority in Celje (Athletik SK in 1906). In 1911, the first Slovenian football club of the Slovenian minority opened in Ljubljana, Ilirija, followed by Slovan two years later. Ilirija is nowadays considered by the Slovenian FA as the oldest running football club in the country, because the Lendava-based club went bankrupt in 2012, although it got recreated right away.

Spain 
Founded on 23 December 1889, Recreativo de Huelva is the oldest football club in Spain. Two Scots, Alexander Mackay and Robert Russell Ross, overseas workers at the Rio Tinto mines, founded Huelva Recreation Club to provide their employees with physical recreation. Recreativo de Huelva predates Sevilla Foot-ball Club, which was founded a month later and it is not related with Sevilla FC, founded on 1905. The oldest football clubs are found in England and France.

Sweden 
The oldest still active football club in Sweden is Örgryte IS founded on 4 December 1887.

Switzerland
FC St. Gallen 1879 is the oldest active football club in Switzerland and the second oldest in continental Europe, founded on 19 April 1879 as FC St. Gallen.

Turkey 
The oldest football club in Turkey is Besiktas JK, founded in 1903. The oldest club founded in the actual turkish territory is Panonios, founded in the city of Izmir in 1890. Being the club of the greek community, it have been relocated in 1922 in the actual greek territory after the population exchange between Greece and Turkey.

North America
Although football variants have been played in North America since the 1820s, the claim of oldest continuous football club in North America is still a matter of debate.

Oneida Football Club of Boston, Massachusetts, established in 1862, was the first organised team to play any kind of football in the United States. The game played by the club, known as the "Boston game", was an informal local variant that predated the codification of rules for association or American football. The team, which consisted of graduates of Boston's elite preparatory schools, played on Boston Common from 1862 to 1865, during which time they reportedly never lost a game or even gave up a single point.

In terms of gridiron football the Hamilton Tiger-Cats of the Canadian Football League can trace their roots back to the Hamilton Football Club (nicknamed the Tigers) which formed in 1869, then later merged with the Hamilton Wildcats in 1950 to form the current franchise. Their rivals to the east, the Toronto Argonauts, were founded four years later in 1873 and have a mostly unchanged franchise history. Both clubs began as rugby football clubs and only later adapted to the gridiron-style of play which would become known as Canadian football. The oldest continuous rugby club in North America which still plays rugby is the McGill University Rugby Football Club which was established in 1863, although their first recorded game was not until 1865. The oldest independent (non-university) rugby club is the Westmount Rugby Club of Montreal, which formed in 1876.

In 1869, Rutgers University and Princeton University competed in the first US intercollegiate football game. According to U.S. Soccer, the rules of this game resembled rugby and association football more closely than gridiron football. However, university-affiliated teams competing in intercollegiate championships are not typically classified as "clubs".

In the United States, gridiron-based variants of the game did not distinguish themselves from existing codes until 1871, when Harvard University began playing a variation known as the "Boston Game." This allowed a player to pick up the ball and run with it if he were chased and it quickly spread, with innovations added by Yale University student Walter Camp. The oldest existing non-university semiprofessional football club is the Watertown Red & Black, which was founded in 1896. The Arizona Cardinals, formed in Chicago in 1898, are the oldest team in the National Football League.

One of the first teams to have played football under the association rules in the US was Fall River Rovers, founded in 1884. The club existed intermittently until 1921. The Milwaukee Wave of the American Indoor Soccer Association, a professional indoor soccer team based in Milwaukee, Wisconsin, was founded in 1984, and is the oldest continuously operating professional soccer team of any kind in the United States. The ten charter members of Major League Soccer were all new clubs created shortly before the league began play in 1996. However, in 2011, the league admitted the Vancouver Whitecaps, who had existed continuously since 1986.

In Mexico, the oldest Football club is Club de Fútbol Pachuca is a Mexican professional football team based in Pachuca, Hidalgo, that competes in Liga MX. Founded by Cornish miners from Camborne and Redruth in 1901, it is one of the oldest football clubs in the Americas, and was one of the founding members of the Mexican Primera División.

Oceania

Australia 

In 1858, in Melbourne, Victoria, members of the Melbourne Cricket Club formed a loosely organised football team, and played against other local football enthusiasts over the winter and spring of that year. The Melbourne Football Club was officially founded the following year on 14 May, and three days later (17 May), four members codified the first laws of Australian rules football. In June 1859, the Castlemaine Football Club and Melbourne University Football Club were formed, and the Geelong Football Club was formed shortly afterwards, in July. Over the next decade, many more Australian rules football clubs were formed in Victoria. Melbourne and Geelong were founding members of the Victorian Football League (VFL) (now AFL), making them the world's oldest football clubs that are now professional.

New Zealand 
Christchurch Football Club, established in 1863, is the oldest football club of any code in New Zealand. The club initially played using its own rules, before converting to rugby football. Wellington Football Club, based in Hataitai, was established in 1870 and is the oldest continuous rugby football club in New Zealand. The honour of being the country's first organised association football club is likely to belong to Auckland's North Shore United, which was founded as North Shore in 1886. Two Dunedin-based clubs, Northern and Wakari, were officially founded in 1888, although it is possible that Northern had been playing as a team prior to this time.

South America

Argentina

Buenos Aires Cricket & Rugby Club claims to be the oldest club still in existence in Argentina. According to the club's website, the club was founded before 8 December 1864 as a cricket institution. The date of foundation has been recognised by the Buenos Aires Rugby Union. It is however believed that the club was founded in 1831, with existing documentary evidence about a cricket match played by Buenos Aires that same year. Nevertheless, the practise of any "football" code did not start until 1951 when the BACC merged with the Buenos Aires F.C. and rugby union was added.

Club Atlético del Rosario was officially established in 1867 as a cricket institution. The club soon added association football, being the first club from Rosario playing in the Primera División, the top division of Argentina. In rugby union, Rosario AC played the first inter-clubs match in the country on 28 June 1886, when the team faced Buenos Aires Football Club.

Having been established in 1875, Club Mercedes is considered the oldest association football club still in existence in Argentina. This places Mercedes above Gimnasia y Esgrima de La Plata and Quilmes, both founded in 1887.

Bolivia
Oruro Royal was founded on 26 May 1896 by the English workers hired by the Bolivian Government to build the national railways, becoming the first Bolivian football squad.

Brazil
São Paulo Athletic Club, founded on 13 May 1888 by English immigrants as a cricket club, could be considered the oldest Brazilian club to have played any code of "football", starting to play association football in 1898. After football retired from competitions in 1912, rugby union became the main sport of SPAC.

The oldest club to have been in continuous activity in association football is S.C. Rio Grande, founded in July 1900. 
Fluminense Football Club, founded on 21 July 1902, is the oldest football club of Brazil with the word "football" in its name. It is also the first of the Brazilian big clubs and the cradle of the national team of Brazil.

São Paulo Railway Company and São Paulo Gaz Company, both established in 1895 (and then defunct) played the first football match in Brazil that same year.

Chile
Santiago Wanderers was founded on 15 August 1892 by Irish community and was the first football club in Chile.

Colombia

The defunct Barranquilla Football Club founded by British railway workers in 1908 was the first football club in Colombia.

Peru
Lima Cricket and Football Club claims to be the oldest football-practising club in Peru and the Americas, having been founded in 1859 by the city's British community.

Uruguay
In Uruguay, the Montevideo Cricket Club, established in 1861, has however been ranked as the oldest rugby union club outside Europe by the World Rugby Museum of Twickenham, although the first certain rugby match played by MVCC was in 1875.

Oldest School Football Clubs
These are the earliest schools to have evidence of regular, organised football. Each school would originally have played its own code.

Aldenham School F.C. was reported in The Football Annual 1873 (Charles Alcock) to have been founded in 1825 but there are no primary sources to support this and it is disputed.

Before 1860

1860–1869

1870–1879

1880–1889

See also
Sports clubs by year of establishment
Oldest football competitions
Club of Pioneers

Notes

References

Sources
 1824: The World's First Foot-Ball Club, John Hutchinson and Andy Mitchell. Andy Mitchell Media, 2018. .

External links
 Top 20 oldest football clubs in the world
University of Manchester, "Local studies in the History of Sport England" (Bibliography)

History of association football
History of rugby union
History of Australian rules football
History of rugby league
 
Superlatives in sports
Oldest things